CKTO-FM is a Canadian radio station, broadcasting at 100.9 FM in Truro, Nova Scotia. The station airs an adult hits format and is branded as Bounce 100.9, which has a wide coverage area over much of western and central Nova Scotia and Prince Edward Island. The station has been on the air since 1965.

The station is owned by Bell Media, which also owns sister station CKTY-FM as well as six other radio stations in the Atlantic provinces.

History
The station first began broadcasting in March 1965 originally as CKCL-FM before adopting its current call letters. The station's original call letters were later used on a Chilliwack, British Columbia radio station serving the Greater Vancouver area. The station was a CBC Radio affiliate until February 4, 1982. The station was owned and operated by Radio Atlantic Ltd before it was purchased by Telemedia in 1999 and by Astral Media in 2002 and then Bell Media in 2013. CKTO was originally known as Mix 100.9 FM (or 100.9 The Mix) with a hot adult contemporary format before it adopted the EZ Rock branding in 2001 and became known as EZ Rock 100.9 FM with an adult contemporary format. In 2002, the station rebranded to "Big Dog 100.9" with a rock-leaning Hot AC format. It was one of several Hot AC stations in Canada that leaned towards rock music. In early 2018, the station shifted to full-time rock while keeping the "Big Dog" branding.

As part of a mass format reorganization by Bell Media, on May 18, 2021, CKTO flipped to adult hits, and adopted the Bounce branding.

Former logos

References

External links
 Big Dog 100.9
 
 

Kto
Kto
Kto
Truro, Nova Scotia
Radio stations established in 1965
1965 establishments in Nova Scotia